Tampa Pro is an annual professional skateboard competition in Tampa, Florida, United States (U.S.). The competition is held at the Skatepark of Tampa in late March and a new course is designed every year.

Winners 
List of past winners of Tampa Pro

References

External links
 Official website
 Tampa Pro 2001 video

Skateboarding competitions
Recurring sporting events established in 1995
Sports competitions in Tampa, Florida